IEC 61360, with the title "Standard data element types with associated classification scheme", is a series of standard documents defining a general purpose vocabulary in terms of a reference dictionary published by the International Electrotechnical Commission.

Intended use 
The vocabulary specified in IEC 61360 may be used to define ontologies for use in the field of electrotechnology, electronics and related domains.

Structure 
The IEC 61360 series is structured into different parts:
  IEC 61360-1 - Part 1: Definitions - Principles and methods
  IEC 61360-2 - Part 2: EXPRESS dictionary schema 
  IEC 61360-4 - Part 4: IEC Common Data Dictionary (IEC CDD)
  IEC 61360-6 - Part 6: IEC Common Data Dictionary (IEC CDD) quality guidelines

IEC 61360-1 provides a detailed introduction to the structure of the dictionary and its use. 
IEC 61360-2 specifies the detailed dictionary data model and IEC 61360-6 stipulates quality criteria for the content of the dictionary.
The data model defined in IEC 61360-2 is also published in ISO 13584-42.

The IEC provides a technical dictionary for the use in the electro-technical and electronic domain which is published as IEC 61360-4. This dictionary is called IEC Common Data Dictionary (IEC CDD) and can be accessed as a web page (https://cdd.iec.ch).

See also 
IEC 61360 also defines the base for other product taxonomies like eCl@ss.

Industrie 4.0 uses product property description based on IEC 61360.

References 

61360